Zysman is a surname. Notable people with the surname include:

Jack Hardy (born Dale Zysman, 1901–1993), American labor leader and teacher
John Zysman (born 1946), American political scientist
Shalom Zysman (1914–1967), Israeli politician

See also
 Zisman